Nebria nigerrima is a species of ground beetle in the Nebriinae subfamily that can be found in Asian countries such as  Armenia, Iran, and Turkey. In Europe, it can only be found in the southern part of Russia. In 2004 it was described in Georgia.

Subspecies
Nebria nigerrima testadilatata Morvan, 1974

References

nigerrima
Beetles described in 1846
Beetles of Asia
Beetles of Europe